The 2021 wildfire season involves wildfires on multiple continents. Even at halfway through the calendar year, wildfire seasons were larger than in previous history, with increased extreme weather caused by climate change (such as droughts and heat waves) strengthening the intensity and scale of fires.

Below is a partial list of articles on wildfires from around the world in the year 2021.

Africa 
 Algeria
2021 Algeria wildfires
 South Africa

2021 Table Mountain fire

Asia 
 Cyprus
2021 Limassol wildfires
 India
2020–21 Dzüko Valley wildfires
2021 Simlipal forest fires
 Israel
2021 Israel wildfires
 Russia

2021 Russian wildfires

Turkey
2021 Turkish wildfires

Europe 
France
2021 France wildfires
Greece
2021 Greece wildfires
Italy
2021 Italy wildfires

North America 
As of September 14, 2021, the National Interagency Fire Center (NIFC) reported that 44,647 wildfires in the United States had burned 5.6 million acres of land. Similarly, the Canadian Interagency Forest Fire Centre (CIFFC) announced that 6,317 wildfires burned 10.34 million acres. Initially, the NIFC declared that the United States and Canada had a preparedness level of 5, meaning it had the potential to exhaust national firefighting resources. Due to the earliness and severity of the wildfire season, the United States and Canada were unable to provide each other with aid as in previous years. However, by September 20, 2021, the national preparedness level was reduced to 4 and 1 for the United States and Canada, respectively.

In April 2021, the North American wildfire season was predicted to be severe due to record drought conditions and high spring temperatures in the West. In May, more than 75% of the western United States experienced drought conditions, with 21% of these conditions being deemed as "exceptional drought", which is the most extreme level of drought. These extreme conditions result in a lack of moisture on the ground that is imperative for combating wildfires.  In Arizona, there were 311 early wildfires in the first four months of the year, compared to 127 in the same period in 2020.

In July 2021, haze from West Coast fires was affecting East Coast cities, and particulate pollution caused unhealthy air quality in New Hampshire.

In Montana, evacuation orders had displaced around 600 people by early August. 

On October 21, the national preparedness level was lowered to 1 (indicating minimal fire activity). By November 5, a total of 48,725 wildfires had burned more than 6.5 million acres across the United States, according to the National Interagency Fire Center (NIFC).

 Canada
2021 British Columbia wildfires

 Mexico
2021 Nuevo León wildfires
 United States
2021 Arizona wildfires
2021 California wildfires
2021 Colorado wildfires
2021–2022 Boulder County fires
2021 Idaho wildfires
Snake River Complex Fire
2021 Kansas wildfires
December 15 outbreak
2021 Minnesota wildfires
Greenwood Lake Fire
2021 Montana wildfires
Richard Spring Fire
2021 New Mexico wildfires
2021 Oregon wildfires
2021 Texas wildfires
2021 Utah wildfires
2021 Washington wildfires

South America 
2021 Argentine Patagonia wildfires
2021 Chilean Patagonia wildfire

Oceania 
2020–21 Australian bushfire season

See also 
Weather of 2021
2021 Eurasia winter heatwave

References 

 
2021